McCool is a town in Attala County, Mississippi. The population was 135 at the 2010 census.

History
McCool post office was established September 11, 1883, with Charles W. Thompson as first postmaster. The town was named for James F. McCool, Chancellor of the 6th Chancery court district of Mississippi, and former speaker
of the Mississippi House of Representatives.

The population was 317 in 1900.

Geography

Demographics

As of the census of 2000, there were 182 people, 72 households, and 49 families residing in the town. The population density was 193.6 people per square mile (74.8/km2). There were 82 housing units at an average density of 87.2 per square mile (33.7/km2). The racial makeup of the town was 73.08% White, 25.82% African American, 0.55% Asian, and 0.55% from two or more races.

There were 72 households, out of which 31.9% had children under the age of 18 living with them, 55.6% were married couples living together, 8.3% had a female householder with no husband present, and 31.9% were non-families. 27.8% of all households were made up of individuals, and 16.7% had someone living alone who was 65 years of age or older. The average household size was 2.53 and the average family size was 3.14.

In the town, the population was spread out, with 20.9% under the age of 18, 12.1% from 18 to 24, 25.3% from 25 to 44, 23.1% from 45 to 64, and 18.7% who were 65 years of age or older. The median age was 41 years. For every 100 females, there were 87.6 males. For every 100 females age 18 and over, there were 73.5 males.

The median income for a household in the town was $19,659, and the median income for a family was $27,083. Males had a median income of $24,583 versus $20,000 for females. The per capita income for the town was $10,760. About 18.4% of families and 19.6% of the population were below the poverty line, including 13.5% of those under the age of eighteen and 11.4% of those 65 or over.

Education
The town of McCool is served by the Attala County School District.

Notable people
 Thomas U. Sisson, member of the United States House of Representatives from 1909 to 1923
 Margaret Wade, basketball coach, member of the Basketball Hall of Fame
 John D. Winters, historian, author of The Civil War in Louisiana (1963), was born in McCool but reared in Lake Providence, Louisiana.

References

Towns in Attala County, Mississippi
Towns in Mississippi